An orda (also ordu, ordo, or ordon) or horde was a historical sociopolitical and military structure found on the Eurasian Steppe, usually associated with the Turkic and Mongol peoples. This form of entity can be seen as the regional equivalent of a clan or a tribe. Some successful ordas gave rise to khanates.

While the East Slavic term ordo and later derived term horda/horde were in origin borrowings from the Turkic term ordo for "camp, headquarters", the original term did not carry the meaning of a large khanate such as the Golden Horde. These structures were contemporarily referred to as ulus ("nation" or "tribe").

Etymology

Etymologically, the word "ordu" comes from the Turkic "ordu" which means army in Turkic and Mongolian languages, "seat of power" or "royal court".

Within the Liao Empire of the Khitans, the word ordo was used to refer to a nobleman's personal entourage or court, which included servants, retainers, and bodyguards. Emperors, empresses, and high ranking princes all had ordos of their own, which they were free to manage in practically any way they chose.

In modern times the term is also used to denote Kazakh tribal groupings, known as zhuz. The primary ones are the Younger Horde (junior zhuz) in western Kazakhstan, the Middle Horde (middle zhuz) in central Kazakhstan and the Older Horde (senior zhuz) in southeastern Kazakhstan.

East Slavic orda
The word via Tatar passed into East Slavic as orda (орда), and by the 1550s into English as horde, probably via Polish and French or Spanish. The unetymological initial h- is found in all western European forms and was likely first attached in the Polish form horda.

'Urdu', the name of a language spoken in the Indian subcontinent, is also derived from this Turkic word.

Mongol Empire
Ordu or Ordo also means the Mongolian court. In Mongolian, the Government Palace is called "Zasgiin gazriin ordon".

William of Rubruck described the Mongol mobile tent as follows:

Ibn Battuta writes:

The Century Dictionary and Cyclopedia (1911) defined orda as "a tribe or troop of Asiatic nomads dwelling in tents or wagons, and migrating from place to place to procure pasturage for their cattle, or for war or plunder."

Merriam–Webster defined horde in this context as "a political subdivision of central Asian people" or "a people or tribe of nomadic life".

Ordas would form when families settled in auls would find it impossible to survive in that area and were forced to move. Often, periods of drought would coincide with the rise in the number of ordas. Ordas were patriarchal, with its male members constituting a military. While some ordas were able to sustain themselves from their herds; others turned to pillaging their neighbors. In subsequent fighting, some ordas were destroyed, others assimilated. The most successful ones would, for a time, assimilate most or all other ordas of the Eurasian Steppe and turn to raiding neighboring political entities; those ordas often left their mark on history, the most famous of which is the Golden Horde of the later Mongol Empire.

Famous ordas (hordes) include:
 the White Horde, formed 1226
 the Blue Horde, formed 1227
 the Golden Horde, a Tatar-Mongol state established in the 1240s
 the Great Horde, remnant of the Golden Horde from about 1466 until 1502
 the Nogai Horde, a Tatar clan situated in the Caucasus Mountain region, formed in the 1390s

In modern Mongolian language, the form of the word, Ordon is more commonly used throughout Mongolia and Inner Mongolia.

See also
Nomadic pastoralism
 Cossack host
 Urdu

References

Nomadic groups in Eurasia